The President's Foundation for the Wellbeing of Society is a non-governmental organisation located in Malta, focusing on social research, community consultation, and project work. The Foundation was established on 25 June 2014 by Marie-Louise Coleiro Preca, during her term as the 9th President of Malta.

The Foundation consists of two principal branches; the Research Entities and Consultative Fora. These operate alongside other constituent entities, including the Children's Hub (and its flagship project 'The President's Secret Garden') and International Institute for Peace and Wellbeing. The Foundation maintains memoranda of understanding with various international organisations, in order to further its goals of securing individual and communal wellbeing in society. Organisations with whom the Foundation maintains close contact include UNESCO, ISESCO, UN Women, and the Sovereign Military Order of Malta, and academic connections with the University of Cambridge and Columbia University.

The Director-General of the President's Foundation is Ruth Farrugia, and the Foundation's current Council of Governors includes former presidents and prime ministers of the Republic of Malta Eddie Fenech Adami, Lawrence Gonzi, and Ugo Mifsud Bonnici. The Foundation works closely with the University of Malta, and includes the incumbent Rector of the University as a member of the Council of Governors.

Research Entities

National Institute for Childhood 

The Institute for Childhood exists to promote children’s wellbeing through research, dissemination of research, consultation with relevant stake holders and active participation in debates in matters concerning children and their relationships with significant others.

National Hub for Ethnobotanical Research 

The Hub exists to explore and inspire relationships between people through their cultural experience of the natural world. The Hub's first research publication was launched in April 2016.

National Family Research Centre 

The Family Research Centre promotes understanding through research on all aspects of family life with special emphasis on fostering mutual care and respect in relationships. Research detailing the wellbeing of people in relationships in the Maltese Islands was released in 2016.

National Centre for Freedom from Addiction 

The Centre mission is that of contributing towards nurturing a society that is free from addictive behaviour in all its forms for the purpose of promoting personal, interpersonal and social wellbeing.

National Observatory for Living with Dignity 

The Observatory exists to promote a dignified life for all by critically engaging with knowledge, social structures and human relations, especially through generating empirical data, valorising experiential knowledge and providing access to reliable information on issues related to ecological, social economic and cultural inclusion. The latest research launched by the Observatory included a national study on early school leavers, and the effects of early school leaving on wellbeing.

Consultative Fora 
The Consultative Fora within the President's Foundation engage with diverse communities and groups in Malta and Gozo on issues of direct relevance to their wellbeing. Reports compiled from the findings of the Fora are then presented to the President of Malta, and circulated among the Research Entities and other entities within the President's Foundation.

The results of Fora consultations may lead to further research through the Entities, or other action on topics deemed to be of particular importance. The Consultative Fora include a Disability Forum, Interfaith Forum, Community Forum, Transculturalism Forum, Ageing With Dignity Forum, Child Forum, Culture Forum (chaired by Professor Joe Friggieri), and upcoming Gender Forum. A Family Forum exists, but is presently inactive.

References 

Foundations based in Malta
Think tanks based in Malta